Haboush Saleh Habou Salbukh (born 13 July 1989) is an Emirati professional footballer who plays for Al Bataeh as a midfielder.

Career 
Saleh kicked off his career in 2009 with Baniyas, and becoming a regular since then.

He made his international debut against New Zealand.

References

External links 
 
 
 AG League profile

1989 births
Living people
Association football midfielders
Emirati footballers
Baniyas Club players
Al-Wasl F.C. players
Al Bataeh Club players
UAE First Division League players
UAE Pro League players
2015 AFC Asian Cup players
Asian Games medalists in football
Footballers at the 2010 Asian Games
Asian Games silver medalists for the United Arab Emirates
Medalists at the 2010 Asian Games
United Arab Emirates international footballers